The European Organisation for Astronomical Research in the Southern Hemisphere, commonly referred to as the European Southern Observatory (ESO), is an intergovernmental research organisation made up of 16 member states for ground-based astronomy. Created in 1962, ESO has provided astronomers with state-of-the-art research facilities and access to the southern sky. The organisation employs over 750 staff members and receives annual member state contributions of approximately €162 million. Its observatories are located in northern Chile.

ESO has built and operated some of the largest and most technologically advanced telescopes. These include the 3.6 m New Technology Telescope, an early pioneer in the use of active optics, and the Very Large Telescope (VLT), which consists of four individual 8.2 m telescopes and four smaller auxiliary telescopes which can all work together or separately. The Atacama Large Millimeter Array observes the universe in the millimetre and submillimetre wavelength ranges, and is the world's largest ground-based astronomy project to date. It was completed in March 2013 in an international collaboration by Europe (represented by ESO), North America, East Asia and Chile.

Currently under construction is the Extremely Large Telescope. It will use a 39.3-metre-diameter segmented mirror, and become the world's largest optical reflecting telescope when operational towards the end of this decade. Its light-gathering power will allow detailed studies of planets around other stars, the first objects in the universe, supermassive black holes, and the nature and distribution of the dark matter and dark energy which dominate the universe.

ESO's observing facilities have made astronomical discoveries and produced several astronomical catalogues. Its findings include the discovery of the most distant gamma-ray burst and evidence for a black hole at the centre of the Milky Way. In 2004, the VLT allowed astronomers to obtain the first picture of an extrasolar planet (2M1207b) orbiting a brown dwarf 173 light-years away. The High Accuracy Radial Velocity Planet Searcher (HARPS) instrument installed on the older ESO 3.6 m telescope led to the discovery of extrasolar planets, including Gliese 581c—one of the smallest planets seen outside the Solar System.

History 

The idea that European astronomers should establish a common large observatory was broached by Walter Baade and Jan Oort at the Leiden Observatory in the Netherlands in spring 1953. It was pursued by Oort, who gathered a group of astronomers in Leiden to consider it on June 21 that year. Immediately thereafter, the subject was further discussed at the Groningen conference in the Netherlands. On January 26, 1954, an ESO declaration was signed by astronomers from six European countries expressing the wish that a joint European observatory be established in the southern hemisphere.

At the time, all reflector telescopes with an aperture of 2 metres or more were located in the northern hemisphere. The decision to build the observatory in the southern hemisphere resulted from the necessity of observing the southern sky; some research subjects (such as the central parts of the Milky Way and the Magellanic Clouds) were accessible only from the southern hemisphere.

Although it was initially planned to set up telescopes in South Africa (where several European observatories were located), tests from 1955 to 1963 demonstrated that a site in the Andes was preferable. On November 15, 1963 Chile was chosen as the site for ESO's observatory. The decision was preceded by the ESO Convention, signed 5 October 1962 by Belgium, Germany, France, the Netherlands and Sweden. Otto Heckmann was nominated as the organisation's first director general on 1 November 1962.

A preliminary proposal for a convention of astronomy organisations in these five countries was drafted in 1954. Although some amendments were made in the initial document, the convention proceeded slowly until 1960 when it was discussed during that year's committee meeting. The new draft was examined in detail, and a council member of CERN (the European Organization for Nuclear Research) highlighted the need for a convention between governments (in addition to organisations).
The convention and government involvement became pressing due to rapidly rising costs of site-testing expeditions. The final 1962 version was largely adopted from the CERN convention, due to similarities between the organisations and the dual membership of some members.

In 1966, the first ESO telescope at the La Silla site in Chile began operating. Because CERN (like ESO) had sophisticated instrumentation, the astronomy organisation frequently turned to the nuclear-research body for advice and a collaborative agreement between ESO and CERN was signed in 1970. Several months later, ESO's telescope division moved into a CERN building in Geneva and ESO's Sky Atlas Laboratory was established on CERN property. ESO's European departments moved into the new ESO headquarters in Garching (near Munich), Germany in 1980.

Member states

Chilean observation sites 

Although ESO is headquartered in Germany, its telescopes and observatories are in northern Chile, where the organisation operates advanced ground-based astronomical facilities:
 La Silla, which hosts the New Technology Telescope (NTT)
 Paranal, where the Very Large Telescope (VLT) is located
 Llano de Chajnantor, where ALMA, the Atacama Large Millimeter/submillimeter Array, is located

These are among the best locations for astronomical observations in the southern hemisphere. An ESO project is the Extremely Large Telescope (ELT), a 40-metre-class telescope based on a five-mirror design and the formerly planned Overwhelmingly Large Telescope. The ELT will be the largest visible and near-infrared telescope in the world. ESO began its design in early 2006, and aimed to begin construction in 2012. Construction work at the ELT site started in June 2014. As decided by the ESO council on 26 April 2010, a fourth site (Cerro Armazones) is to be home to ELT.

Each year about 2,000 requests are made for the use of ESO telescopes, for four to six times more nights than are available. Observations made with these instruments appear in a number of peer-reviewed publications annually; in 2017, more than 1,000 reviewed papers based on ESO data were published.

ESO telescopes generate large amounts of data at a high rate, which are stored in a permanent archive facility at ESO headquarters. The archive contains more than 1.5 million images (or spectra) with a total volume of about 65 terabytes (65,000,000,000,000 bytes) of data.

La Silla 

Like other observatories in the area, La Silla is far from sources of light pollution and has one of the darkest night skies on Earth. In La Silla, ESO operates three telescopes: a 3.6-metre telescope, the New Technology Telescope (NTT) and the 2.2-metre Max-Planck-ESO Telescope.

The observatory hosts visitor instruments, attached to a telescope for the duration of an observational run and then removed. La Silla also hosts national telescopes, such as the 1.2-metre Swiss and the 1.5-metre Danish telescopes.

About 300 reviewed publications annually are attributable to the work of the observatory. Discoveries made with La Silla telescopes include the HARPS-spectrograph detection of the planets orbiting within the Gliese 581 planetary system, which contains the first known rocky planet in a habitable zone outside the solar system. Several telescopes at La Silla played a role in linking gamma-ray bursts, the most energetic explosions in the universe since the Big Bang, with the explosions of massive stars. The ESO La Silla Observatory also played a role in the study of supernova SN 1987A.

ESO 3.6-metre telescope 

The ESO 3.6-metre telescope began operations in 1977. It has been upgraded, including the installation of a new secondary mirror. The conventionally designed horseshoe-mount telescope was primarily used for infrared spectroscopy; it now hosts the HARPS spectrograph, used in search of extra-solar planets and for asteroseismology. The telescope was designed for very high long-term radial velocity accuracy (on the order of 1 m/s).

New Technology Telescope 

The New Technology Telescope (NTT) is an altazimuth, 3.58-metre Ritchey–Chrétien telescope, inaugurated in 1989 and the first in the world with a computer-controlled main mirror. The flexible mirror's shape is adjusted during observation to preserve optimal image quality. The secondary mirror position is also adjustable in three directions. This technology (developed by ESO and known as active optics) is now applied to all major telescopes, including the VLT and the future ELT.

The design of the octagonal enclosure housing the NTT is innovative. The telescope dome is relatively small and ventilated by a system of flaps directing airflow smoothly across the mirror, reducing turbulence and resulting in sharper images.

MPG/ESO 2.2-metre telescope 

The 2.2-metre telescope has been in operation at La Silla since early 1984, and is on indefinite loan to ESO from the Max Planck Society (Max-Planck-Gesellschaft zur Förderung der Wissenschaften, or MPG, in German). Telescope time is shared between MPG and ESO observing programmes, while operation and maintenance of the telescope are ESO's responsibility.

Its instrumentation includes a 67-million-pixel wide-field imager (WFI) with a field of view as large as the full moon, which has taken many images of celestial objects. Other instruments used are GROND (Gamma-Ray Burst Optical Near-Infrared Detector), which seeks the afterglow of gamma-ray bursts—the most powerful explosions in the universe, and the high-resolution spectrograph FEROS (Fiber-fed Extended Range Optical Spectrograph), used to make detailed studies of stars.

Other telescopes 

La Silla also hosts several national and project telescopes not operated by ESO. Among them are the Swiss Euler Telescope, the Danish National Telescope and the REM, TRAPPIST and TAROT telescopes.
 The Euler Telescope is a 1.2-metre telescope built and operated by the Geneva Observatory in Switzerland. It is used to conduct high-precision radial velocity measurements primarily used in the search for large extrasolar planets in the southern celestial hemisphere. Its first discovery was a planet orbiting Gliese 86. Other observing programmes focus on variable stars, asteroseismology, gamma-ray bursts, monitoring active galactic nuclei (AGN) and gravitational lenses.
 The 1.54-metre Danish National Telescope was built by Grubb-Parsons and has been in use at La Silla since 1979. The telescope has an off-axis mount, and the optics are a Ritchey-Chrétien design. Because of the telescope's mount and limited space inside the dome, it has significant pointing restrictions.

 The Rapid Eye Mount telescope is a small rapid-reaction automatic telescope with a primary  mirror. The telescope, in an altazimuth mount, began operation in October 2002. The primary purpose of the telescope is to follow the afterglow of the GRBs detected by the Swift Gamma-Ray Burst Mission satellite.
 The Belgian TRAPPIST is a joint venture between the University of Liège and Geneva Observatory. The 0.60-metre telescope is specialised in comets, exoplanets, and was one of the few telescopes that observed a stellar occultation of the dwarf planet Eris, revealing that it may be smaller than Pluto.
 The Quick-action telescope for transient objects, TAROT, is a very fast-moving optical robotic telescope able to observe a gamma-ray burst from its beginning. Satellites detecting GRBs send signals to TAROT, which can provide a sub-arc second position to the astronomical community. Data from the TAROT telescope is also useful in studying the evolution of GRBs, the physics of a fireball and its surrounding material. It is operated from the Haute-Provence Observatory in France.

Paranal 

The Paranal Observatory is located atop Cerro Paranal in the Atacama Desert in northern Chile.

The observatory has seven major telescopes operating in visible and infrared light: the four  telescopes of the Very Large Telescope, the  VLT Survey Telescope (VST) and the  Visible and Infrared Survey Telescope for Astronomy. In addition, there are four  auxiliary telescopes forming an array used for interferometric observations. In March 2008, Paranal was the location for several scenes of the 22nd James Bond film, Quantum of Solace.

Very Large Telescope 

The main facility at Paranal is the VLT, which consists of four nearly identical  unit telescopes (UTs), each hosting two or three instruments. These large telescopes can also work together in groups of two or three as a giant interferometer. The ESO Very Large Telescope Interferometer (VLTI) allows astronomers to see details up to 25 times finer than those seen with the individual telescopes. The light beams are combined in the VLTI with a complex system of mirrors in tunnels, where the light paths must diverge less than 1/1000 mm over 100 metres. The VLTI can achieve an angular resolution of milliarcseconds, equivalent to the ability to see the headlights of a car on the Moon.

The first of the UTs had its first light in May 1998, and was offered to the astronomical community on 1 April 1999. The other telescopes followed suit in 1999 and 2000, making the VLT fully operational. Four 1.8-metre auxiliary telescopes (ATs), installed between 2004 and 2007, have been added to the VLTI for accessibility when the UTs are used for other projects.

Data from the VLT have led to the publication of an average of more than one peer-reviewed scientific paper per day; in 2017, over 600 reviewed scientific papers were published based on VLT data. The VLT's scientific discoveries include imaging an extrasolar planet, tracking individual stars moving around the supermassive black hole at the centre of the Milky Way and observing the afterglow of the furthest known gamma-ray burst.

At the Paranal inauguration in March 1999, names of celestial objects in the Mapuche language were chosen to replace the technical designations of the four VLT Unit Telescopes (UT1–UT4). An essay contest was prior arranged for schoolchildren in the region concerning the meaning of these names which attracted many entries dealing with the cultural heritage of ESO's host country. A 17-year-old adolescent from Chuquicamata, near Calama, submitted the winning essay and was awarded an amateur telescope during the inauguration. The four unit telescopes, UT1, UT2, UT3 and UT4, are since known as Antu (sun), Kueyen (moon), Melipal (Southern Cross), and Yepun (Evening Star), with the latter having been originally mistranslated as "Sirius", instead of "Venus".

Survey telescopes 

Visible and Infrared Survey Telescope for Astronomy (VISTA) is housed on the peak adjacent to the one hosting the VLT, sharing observational conditions. Its deviations from a perfect surface are less than a few thousandths the thickness of a human hair, and its construction and polishing presented a challenge.

VISTA was conceived and developed by a consortium of 18 universities in the United Kingdom led by Queen Mary, University of London, and it became an in-kind contribution to ESO as part of the UK's ratification agreement. The telescope's design and construction were managed by the Science and Technology Facilities Council's UK Astronomy Technology Centre (STFC, UK ATC). Provisional acceptance of VISTA was formally granted by ESO at the December 2009 ceremony at ESO headquarters in Garching, which was attended by representatives of Queen Mary, University of London and STFC. Since then the telescope has been operated by ESO, capturing quality images since it began operation.

The VLT Survey Telescope (VST) is a state-of-the-art,  telescope equipped with OmegaCAM, a 268-megapixel CCD camera with a field of view four times the area of the full moon. It complements VISTA by surveying the sky in visible light. The VST (which became operational in 2011) is the result of a joint venture between ESO and the Astronomical Observatory of Capodimonte (Naples), a research centre at the Italian National Institute for Astrophysics INAF.

The scientific goals of both surveys range from the nature of dark energy to assessing near-Earth objects. Teams of European astronomers will conduct the surveys; some will cover most of the southern sky, while others will focus on smaller areas. VISTA and the VST are expected to produce large amounts of data; a single picture taken by VISTA has 67 megapixels, and images from OmegaCam (on the VST) will have 268 megapixels. The two survey telescopes collect more data every night than all the other instruments on the VLT combined. The VST and VISTA produce more than 100 terabytes of data per year.

Llano de Chajnantor 

The site is  higher than the Mauna Kea Observatory and  higher than the Very Large Telescope on Cerro Paranal. It is dry and inhospitable to humans, but a good site for submillimetre astronomy; because water vapour molecules in Earth's atmosphere absorb and attenuate submillimetre radiation, a dry site is required for this type of radio astronomy. The telescopes are:
 Atacama Cosmology Telescope (ACT; not operated by ESO)
 Atacama Pathfinder Experiment (Operated on behalf of the Max Planck Institute for Radio Astronomy (MPIfR))
 Atacama Large Millimeter Array
 Q/U Imaging Experiment (QUIET; not operated by ESO) 
 POLARBEAR (on the Huan Tran Telescope; not operated by ESO)

ALMA is a telescope designed for millimetre and submillimetre astronomy. This type of astronomy is a relatively unexplored frontier, revealing a universe which cannot be seen in more-familiar visible or infrared light and ideal for studying the "cold universe"; light at these wavelengths shines from vast cold clouds in interstellar space at temperatures only a few tens of degrees above absolute zero. Astronomers use this light to study the chemical and physical conditions in these molecular clouds, the dense regions of gas and cosmic dust where new stars are being born. Seen in visible light, these regions of the universe are often dark and obscure due to dust; however, they shine brightly in the millimetre and submillimetre portions of the electromagnetic spectrum. This wavelength range is also ideal for studying some of the earliest (and most distant) galaxies in the universe, whose light has been redshifted into longer wavelengths from the expansion of the universe.

Atacama Pathfinder Experiment 

ESO hosts the Atacama Pathfinder Experiment, APEX, and operates it on behalf of the Max Planck Institute for Radio Astronomy (MPIfR). APEX is a  diameter telescope, operating at millimetre and submillimetre wavelengths — between infrared light and radio waves.

Atacama Large Millimeter/submillimeter Array 

ALMA is an astronomical interferometer of innovative design, initially composed of 66 high-precision antennas and operating at wavelengths of 0.3 to 3.6 mm. Its main array will have 50  antennas acting as a single interferometer. An additional compact array of four 12-metre and twelve  antennas is also planned. The array will be able to probe the universe at millimetre and submillimeter wavelengths with unprecedented sensitivity and resolution, with vision up to ten times sharper than the Hubble Space Telescope. These images will complement those made with the VLT Interferometer. ALMA is a collaboration between East Asia (Japan and Taiwan), Europe (ESO), North America (USA and Canada) and Chile.

The scientific goals of ALMA include studying the origin and formation of stars, galaxies, and planets with observations of molecular gas and dust, studying distant galaxies towards the edge of the observable universe and studying relic radiation from the Big Bang. A call for ALMA science proposals was issued on 31 March 2011, and early observations began on 3 October.

ESO telescopes: research and discoveries

Search for extrasolar planets 

"Is there life elsewhere in the universe?" is one of humankind's most profound unanswered questions. A step in the attempt to answer this question is the search for planets outside the Solar System. ESO's observatories are equipped with an arsenal of instruments for finding, studying, and monitoring extrasolar planets. In 2004, the Very Large Telescope detected a faint glow from an apparent planet orbiting a star about 200 light-years from earth. A year later, this detection was confirmed as the first picture of an exoplanet ever recorded. Although the planet is large (five times more massive than Jupiter), this observation is a first step toward identifying the physical structure and chemical composition of exoplanets.

Despite the fact that planets seem very common in the universe they are tiny, faint objects at cosmic scales; this makes their detection difficult with current technology. For this reason, most exoplanets have been detected with indirect methods. Of these, the most successful has been the radial velocity method. HARPS (the High Accuracy Radial-velocity Planet Searcher) has allowed the discovery of a number of planets with masses below that of Neptune orbiting nearby stars. However, few of these planets are among the smallest ever discovered, or reside in its star's habitable zone. The possibility exists that one of these planets is covered by oceans; this discovery is an encouraging result in the search for planets which could support life.

The Danish 1.54-metre telescope at La Silla participated in the discovery of one of the most Earth-like planets found to date. The planet, detected using the microlensing technique and about five times as massive as Earth, circles its parent star in about 10 years and most certainly has a rocky and icy surface.

In 2017, Breakthrough Initiatives and the European Southern Observatory (ESO) entered a collaboration to enable and implement a search for habitable planets in the nearby star system, Alpha Centauri. The agreement involves Breakthrough Initiatives providing funding for an upgrade to the VISIR (VLT Imager and Spectrometer for mid-Infrared) instrument on ESO's Very Large Telescope (VLT) in Chile. This upgrade will greatly increase the likelihood of planet detection in the system.

In August 2016, the European Southern Observatory announced the detection of a planet orbiting the third star in the Alpha Centauri system, Proxima Centauri. The planet, called Proxima Centauri b, could be a potential target for one of the projects of Breakthrough Initiatives.

Breakthrough Starshot is a proof of concept mission to send a fleet of ultra-fast light-driven nanocraft to explore the Alpha Centauri star system, which could pave the way for a first launch within the next generation. An objective of the mission would be to make a fly-by of and possibly photograph any Earth-like worlds that might exist in the system.

In March 2019, ESO astronomers, employing the GRAVITY instrument on their Very Large Telescope Interferometer (VLTI), announced the first direct detection of an exoplanet, HR 8799 e, using optical interferometry.

Age of the universe 

With the Very Large Telescope, astronomers have made an independent determination of the age of the universe and shed new light on the earliest stages of the Milky Way. For the first time, they measured the amount of the radioactive isotope uranium-238 in a star born when the Milky Way was still forming.

Like carbon dating over longer timescales, the uranium clock measures the age of a star. It shows that this star is 12.5 billion years old. Because the star cannot be older than the universe itself, the universe must be older than this. This agrees with known cosmology, which gives an age of the universe of 13.8 billion years. The star (and the Milky Way) must have formed soon after the Big Bang.

Another result is the first measurement of the beryllium content of two stars in a Milky Way globular cluster. With this measurement, astronomers found that the first generation of stars in our galaxy must have formed soon after the end of the 200-million-year "Dark Age" following the Big Bang.

Milky Way black hole 

Astronomers long suspected that a black hole exists at the center of the Milky Way, but their theory was unproven. Conclusive evidence was obtained after 16 years of monitoring the Galactic Center with ESO telescopes at the La Silla and Paranal observatories.

Stars at the centre of the Milky Way are so densely packed that special imaging techniques (such as adaptive optics) were needed to boost the resolution of the VLT. Thanks to these techniques, astronomers were able to watch individual stars with unprecedented accuracy as they circled the Galactic Center. Their paths conclusively demonstrated that they were orbiting in the immense gravitational grip of a supermassive black hole nearly three million times more massive than the Sun. The VLT observations also revealed flashes of infrared light emerging from the region at regular intervals. While the cause of this phenomenon is unknown, observers have suggested that the black hole may be spinning rapidly.

The VLT has also peered into the centre of galaxies beyond our own, where clear signs of activity produced by supermassive black holes are found. In the active galaxy NGC 1097, a complex network of filaments spiraling from the main part of the galaxy to its centre was seen in great detail.

Gamma-ray bursts 

Gamma-ray bursts (GRBs) are bursts of highly energetic gamma rays lasting from less than one second to several minutes. They are known to occur at great distances from earth, near the limits of the observable universe.

The VLT has observed the afterglow of the farthest known gamma-ray burst. With a measured redshift of 8.2, the light from this very remote astronomical source has taken more than 13 billion years to reach the earth. It occurred when the universe was less than 600 million years old (less than five percent of its present age), and released 300 times as much energy in a few seconds as the sun will in its entire lifetime (more than 10 billion years).

The nature of these explosions has long been a mystery. Observations show that GRBs are one of two types: short- (less than a few seconds) and long-duration. Until 2003, it was suspected that two different types of cosmic event caused them. In 2003, ESO telescopes followed the aftermath of an explosion for one month. Their data showed that the light had similar properties to that of a supernova, and allowed astronomers to link long-duration GRBs with the ultimate explosions of massive stars (hypernovae). In 2005, ESO telescopes detected visible light after a short-duration burst and tracked this light for three weeks. The conclusion was that short-duration bursts could not be caused by a hypernova; instead, it is thought that they originate in the violent merges of neutron stars or black holes.
Observations of gamma-ray-burst afterglows were coordinated between the VLT and the Atacama Pathfinder Experiment (APEX) to identify the possible counterpart (and its decay) at submillimeter wavelengths.

Digital archives 

The Science Archive Operation Group receives and redistributes ESO data and provides archival support. About 200 Terabytes (TB) of public data are distributed per year through the ESO archive. The archive is about 1.01 Petabytes (PB), with an input rate of about 131 TB per year; this is being increased by a factor of 10 or so due to the survey telescopes' data-production rate.

Breakthroughs in telescope, detector and computer technology now allow astronomical surveys to produce large numbers of images, spectra and catalogues. These data sets cover the sky at all wavelengths, from gamma- and X-rays through optical, infrared and radio waves. Astronomers are developing ways to make the large amount of data easily accessible. These techniques use the grid paradigm of distributed computing with seamless, transparent access to data through virtual observatories (VOs). As a physical observatory has telescopes with unique astronomical instruments, a VO consists of data centres with unique collections of astronomical data, software systems and processing capabilities. This global, community-based initiative is being developed under the International Virtual Observatory Alliance and in Europe as part of the EURO-VO project.

VOs have proven their effectiveness in a number of ways, including discovering 31 optically faint, obscured quasar candidates in existing Great Observatories Origins Deep Survey (GOODS) fields (quadrupling the number previously found). The discovery means that surveys of supermassive black holes have underestimated their numbers by a factor of two to five.

Major discoveries 

 Astronomers Capture First Image of a Black Hole
 ESO, ALMA, and APEX contribute to paradigm-shifting observations of the gargantuan black hole at the heart of the galaxy Messier 87 The Event Horizon Telescope (EHT) — a planet-scale array of eight ground-based radio telescopes forged through international collaboration — was designed to capture images of a black hole. EHT researchers have succeeded producing the first direct visual evidence of a supermassive black hole and its shadow. The image reveals the black hole at the centre of Messier 87, a massive galaxy in the nearby Virgo galaxy cluster.
Planet Found in Habitable Zone Around Nearest Star, Proxima Centauri
 The long-sought world, designated Proxima b, orbits its cool red parent star every 11 days and has a temperature suitable for liquid water to exist on its surface. This rocky world is a little more massive than the Earth and is the closest exoplanet to us — and it may also be the closest possible abode for life outside the Solar System.
 Revolutionary ALMA image reveals planetary genesis
 In 2014, ALMA, the Atacama Large Millimeter/submillimeter Array, revealed remarkable details of a solar system that is forming. The images of HL Tauri were the sharpest ever made at submillimetre wavelengths. They show how forming planets are vacuuming up dust and gas in a protoplanetary disc.
 Stars orbiting Milky Way black hole
 Several of ESO telescopes were used in a 16-year study to obtain the most detailed view to date of the surroundings of the supermassive black hole at the centre of the galaxy.
 Accelerating universe
 Two independent research teams have shown that the universe's expansion is accelerating, based on exploding-star observations with astronomical telescopes at La Silla. The research teams were awarded the 2011 Nobel Prize in Physics for their discovery.
 Oldest known Milky Way star
 Using ESO's VLT, astronomers have measured the age of the oldest known star in the Milky Way. At 13.2 billion years, the star was born in the universe's earliest era of star formation. However, the oldest star seems to be 13.6 billion years old, and the Methuselah star might be even older.
 Measuring exoplanet spectra and atmosphere
 The atmosphere around an exoplanet has been analysed for the first time with the VLT. The planet, GJ 1214b, was studied as it passed in front of its parent star and starlight passed through the planet's atmosphere.
 First image of exoplanet
 The VLT has obtained the first image of a planet outside the Solar System. The 5-Jupiter-mass planet orbits a failed star—a brown dwarf—at a distance of 55 times the mean Earth-Sun distance.
 First light from gravitational wave source
 ESO’s fleet of telescopes in Chile have detected the first visible counterpart to a gravitational wave source. These historic observations suggest that this unique object is the result of the merger of two neutron stars. The cataclysmic aftermaths of this kind of merger — long-predicted events called kilonovae — disperse heavy elements such as gold and platinum throughout the Universe.
 Rich planetary system
 Astronomers using HARPS have discovered a planetary system (with at least five planets) orbiting a sunlike star, HD 10180. Two other planets may be present, one of which would have the lowest mass ever found.
 Supermassive black hole flares at Milky Way centre
 The VLT and APEX collaborated to study violent flares from the supermassive black hole at the centre of the Milky Way, revealing material stretched as it orbits in the intense gravitational field near the central black hole.
 Gamma-ray bursts
 ESO telescopes have provided proof that long gamma-ray bursts are linked with the explosion of massive stars; short gamma-ray bursts seem to be produced by merging neutron stars.
 Milky Way stellar motion
 After more than 1,000 nights of observation at La Silla over a 15-year period, astronomers have determined the motion of more than 14,000 sunlike stars in the vicinity of the sun (demonstrating that the Milky Way is more turbulent and chaotic than previously thought).
 Cosmic-temperature measurements
 The VLT has detected, for the first time, carbon-monoxide molecules in a galaxy located almost 11 billion light-years away. This has allowed astronomers to obtain a precise measurement of cosmic temperature at such a remote location.

 Record-breaking planetary system
 Astronomers have found a system of seven Earth-sized planets just 40 light-years away. Using ground and space telescopes, including ESO’s Very Large Telescope, the planets were all detected as they passed in front of their parent star, the ultracool dwarf star known as TRAPPIST-1. Three of the planets lie in the habitable zone and could harbour oceans of water on their surfaces, increasing the possibility that the star system could play host to life. This system has both the largest number of Earth-sized planets yet found and the largest number of worlds that could support liquid water on their surfaces.

Outreach 

Outreach activities are carried out by the ESO education and Public Outreach Department (ePOD). These include a range of programs and products that aim to meet the requirements of media, science communicators and the public, such as press releases, images, videos and printed material.
Events such as the 2009 International Year of Astronomy (IYA2009) (with IAU and UNESCO), VLT First Light, Astronomy Online and the Comet Shoemaker–Levy 9 impact, have been reported by the Department. ePOD organises exhibitions and educational campaigns, such as Venus Transit, Science on Stage and Science in School.

ePOD also manages the ESO Supernova Planetarium & Visitor Centre, an astronomy centre located at the site of the ESO Headquarters in Garching bei München, which was inaugurated 26 April 2018.

A collection of photos and videos can be found in the ESO Public Image Gallery and Video Library. Products from educational material to press kits may be downloaded from the ePOD website or ordered in physical form.

As part of the Department, European outreach for the NASA/ESA Hubble Space Telescope provides comprehensive information about the telescope and its scientific discoveries. The International Astronomical Union (IAU) Press Office is also hosted by ePOD.

Publications 

The ESO Annual Report details activities across the organisation and outlines scientific, technical and organisational highlights. All issues dating back to the first report in 1964 are available for download.

ESO press releases describe scientific, technical and organisational developments and achievements and results obtained by scientists with ESO facilities. The organisation publishes three types of press releases. Science releases describe results (usually appearing in a peer-reviewed journal) involving data from ESO observatories or staff. Organisational releases cover a range of themes related to ESO operations, including news on current and future observatories, new astronomical instruments and announcements of exhibitions worldwide. ESO also selects its best astronomical images, and presents them publicly in periodic photo releases. All press releases (dating back to 1985) are available online. There are child-friendly versions and press releases translated into the languages of ESO's member countries.

The Messenger is a quarterly journal which has presented ESO's activities to the public since May 1974. All back copies are available for download. ESO also publishes announcements and Pictures of the Week on its website. Announcements are shorter than press releases (typically less than 200 words) highlighting stories and events of interest to the community. Pictures of the Week show beautiful (or interesting) photos from ESO telescopes, and may highlight recent events or archival photos. All former entries are available on the website. ESO also publishes several newsletters aimed at scientists and the general public; these are available upon subscription.

The ESOcast is a video-podcast series dedicated to reporting news and research from ESO.

In 2013, the IMAX documentary Hidden Universe 3D was produced in co-operation of Cinema Productions, Film Victoria, Swinburne University of Technology, and the European Southern Observatory.

Video gallery

Image gallery 

These images are from ESO's top-100 list.

See also

References

Bibliography

External links 

 Atacama Large Millimeter Array
 APEX telescope
 ESO
 ESO Top 100 Images
 Webpage for the ESO telescopes at La Silla Observatory
 Paranal Observatory
 James Bond at Paranal 
 ESOcast
 ESO Media on Youtube
 ESO Vimeo channel
 2011 video explaining the current and planned work of ESO

 
Astronomical observatories in Chile
Astronomy institutes and departments
Atacama Desert

International scientific organizations based in Europe
Organisations based in Munich
Organizations established in 1962
Science and technology in Europe
Articles containing video clips
1962 establishments in Chile